The Mayor of Kaohsiung is the head of the Kaohsiung City Government, Taiwan and is elected to a four-year term. The current mayor is Chen Chi-mai who took office since 24 August 2020.

Titles

List of mayors

Prefectural city  era (appointed mayors)
During this era, Kaohsiung was called . All of the mayors were appointed by the Empire of Japan.

Provincial city era (appointed mayors)

Provincial city era (directly elected mayors)

Special municipality era (appointed mayors)

Special municipality era (directly elected mayors)

Special municipality era (consolidated Kaohsiung)

Timeline

See also
 Kaohsiung City Government
 Kaohsiung City Council
 Kaohsiung City 
 List of county magistrates of Kaohsiung

Notes

References

External links

Kaohsiung